The following is a list of the 15 cantons of the Hautes-Alpes department, in France, following the French canton reorganisation which came into effect in March 2015:

 L'Argentière-la-Bessée
 Briançon-1
 Briançon-2
 Chorges
 Embrun
 Gap-1
 Gap-2
 Gap-3
 Gap-4
 Guillestre
 Laragne-Montéglin
 Saint-Bonnet-en-Champsaur
 Serres
 Tallard
 Veynes

References